Patrick McDonnell (born 1956) is an American cartoonist.

Patrick or (Pat) McDonell or McDonnell may also refer to:

Patrick McDonnell (actor), Irish actor
Pat McDonnell, Irish hurler (born 1950)
Pat McDonell, Canadian police officer